John MacFarlane or John Macfarlane may refer to:

Politicians
 John MacFarlane (Ipswich) (1829–1894), Member of the Queensland Legislative Assembly for Ipswich
 John MacFarlane (New South Wales politician) (1813–1873), Scottish-born Australian physician and Member of the New South Wales Legislative Council
 John MacFarlane (Queensland politician) (1823–1880), Member of the Queensland Legislative Assembly for Rockhampton
 John Duncan MacFarlane (1892–1982), farmer and politician in Saskatchewan, Canada
 John Sangster Macfarlane (1818–1880), 19th-century Member of Parliament in Auckland, New Zealand

Others
 John Edward Macfarlane (born 1942), Canadian journalist
 John Macfarlane (artist), Scottish artist and theatre designer, Prix Benois de la Danse winner (2015)
 John Lisle Hall MacFarlane (1851–1874), Scottish rugby player
 John Menzies Macfarlane (1833–1892), Scottish Latter-day Saint hymnwriter
 John Muirhead Macfarlane (1855–1943), Scottish botanist
 John Macfarlane, American businessman, founder and retired CEO of the company Sonos
 John MacFarlane (philosopher), logician and original author of Pandoc

See also 
John McFarlane (disambiguation)